The 2018–19 Chicago State Cougars men's basketball team were led by first-year head coach Lance Irvin. Their home games were held on campus at the Emil and Patricia Jones Convocation Center. The Cougars are members of the Western Athletic Conference. They finished the season 3–29, 0–16 in WAC play to finish in last place. They lost in the quarterfinals of the WAC tournament to New Mexico State.

Previous season
The Cougars finished the 2017–18 season 3–29, 1–13 in WAC play to finish in last place. They lost in the quarterfinals of the WAC tournament to New Mexico State.

The Cougars had the worst average point margin in Division I at –22.7 points, despite winning two games by over 40 points.

After the season, Chicago State fired head coach Tracy Dildy during the week of March 5, 2018, although it was not officially announced until a week later. After a nearly a five-month search, Lance Irvin, a Chicago native and former assistant coach at DePaul and several other schools, was named the new head coach of the Cougars on August 7.

Roster

Schedule and results

|-
!colspan=9 style=| Non-conference regular season

|-
!colspan=9 style=| WAC regular season

|-
!colspan=9 style=| WAC tournament

Source
Source

References

Chicago State Cougars men's basketball seasons
Chicago State
2010s in Chicago
Chicago State
Chicago State
Chicago State
Chicago State